The Synchronicity Tour was a 1983–1984 concert tour by The Police to promote their fifth album, Synchronicity. It kicked off on July 23, 1983 in Chicago and was concluded on March 4, 1984 in Melbourne. It touched three continents for a total of 105 shows. 

During the early dates in the first North American leg, the band resided at a mansion in Bridgehampton, New York and were flown to the concerts. This was the band's final tour as a working unit and one of the highest-grossing tours of the 1980s.

As the band's album Synchronicity featured an extensive use of backing vocals Stewart Copeland and Andy Summers were not able to replicate live due to the intricacies of their drums and guitar parts, the live set was augmented by three vocalists – Michelle Cobb, Dolette McDonald and Tessa Niles. This was only the second time The Police would work with additional musicians on stage, the first being the use of a horns section during the Ghost in the Machine Tour in 1981. 

The grandiosity of the tour and the expectations around it – it came at the end of a five-years progression that saw The Police growing from underground phenomenon to global superstar – put a lot of stress on the band members. "I was never relaxed," drummer Stewart Copeland recalled. "I had so much anxiety. And I know how crazy that must sound to people who do real jobs." Copeland did however cite the 18 August show at Shea Stadium as the peak of "Policemania": "Playing Shea Stadium was big because, even though I'm a septic tank (rhyming slang for 'Yank'), The Police is an English band and I'm a Londoner – an American Londoner – so it felt like conquering America."

According to Sting, the band's performance at Shea Stadium constituted the peak of their career. "I realized that you can't get better than this, you can't climb a mountain higher than this. This is Everest. I made the decision on stage that ok, this is it, this is where this thing stops, right now."

The November 2 and 3 shows in Atlanta were filmed and recorded for a live album and a video release. Synchronicity Concert was originally issued in VHS format in 1984 under the direction of Godley & Creme, who had also been responsible for directing all the music videos from Synchronicity. The film would later be released in DVD format in 2005. The album was mixed but did not materalize until 1995 when it was packaged together with one of the band's early gigs at the Orpheum Theatre in Boston under the title Live!. The double album was produced by Andy Summers.

Setlist
The following setlist is obtained from the 18 August 1983 concert held at the Shea Stadium in New York City. It does not represent all concerts during the tour. For the whole duration of the tour, the setlist largely revolved around Synchronicity. All songs from the album, with the exception of "Mother" and "Miss Gradenko", were performed. "Invisible Sun" and "Don't Stand So Close to Me", from Ghost in the Machine and Zenyatta Mondatta respectively, were performed mostly during the European leg of the tour. During "Hole in My Life" Sting would occasionally add snippets of The Beatles' "Fixing a Hole" or Ray Charles' "Hit the Road Jack". 

"Voices Inside My Head"
"Synchronicity I" / "Synchronicity II"
"Walking in Your Footsteps"
"Message in a Bottle"
"Demolition Man" (some shows)
"Walking on the Moon"
"O My God"
"De Do Do Do, De Da Da Da"
"Wrapped Around Your Finger'
"Tea in the Sahara"
"Spirits in the Material World"
"Hole in My Life"
"One World (Not Three)" 
"King of Pain"
"Every Breath You Take"
"Murder by Numbers"

Encore
"Roxanne"
"Every Little Thing She Does Is Magic" (some shows)
"Can't Stand Losing You" / "Reggatta de Blanc"
"Next to You" (some shows)
"So Lonely"

Opening acts
Joan Jett & The Blackhearts 
A Flock of Seagulls 
The Fixx 
Ministry 
Stevie Ray Vaughan 
Peter Tosh 
Talking Heads 
Blue Peter 
King Sunny Adé 
James Brown 
R.E.M. 
Madness 
Thompson Twins 
Oingo Boingo 
The Animals 
UB40 
Passionate Friends 
Bryan Adams 
Australian Crawl 
Sunnyboys 
Kids in the Kitchen 
Split Enz 
Berlin (band) 
Re-Flex 
Kissing the Pink 
China Crisis

Tour dates

Personnel
Sting – lead vocals, bass guitar, double bass, oboe
Andy Summers – guitar, synthesizer, backing vocals
Stewart Copeland – drums, percussion, xylophone, backing vocals
Michelle Cobb – backing vocals
Dolette McDonald – backing vocals
Tessa Niles – backing vocals
Danny Quatrochi – bass guitar on "Invisible Sun" and "Walking on The Moon" on Atlanta shows when Sting was filming with the camera.

References

External links
"The Police – Synchronicity Tour – 1983 / 1984" (Archive.org snapshot of fan site)
"The Police Synchronicity Tour 1983–84" collection of audio recordings on YouTube"
https://www.setlist.fm/setlist/re-flex/1984/riverfront-coliseum-cincinnati-oh-6b8f8e16.html

The Police concert tours
1983 concert tours
1984 concert tours